Mount Fazio is an ice-free mountain,  high, marking the southwest end of Tobin Mesa, in the Mesa Range of Victoria Land, Antarctica. This topographical feature was first mapped by the United States Geological Survey from surveys and U.S. Navy air photos, 1960–64, and was named by the Advisory Committee on Antarctic Names for William V. Fazio, U.S. Navy, a helicopter crewmember during U.S. Navy Operation Deep Freeze, 1966, 1967 and 1968. The mountain lies situated on the Pennell Coast, a portion of Antarctica lying between Cape Williams and Cape Adare.

References 

Mountains of Victoria Land
Pennell Coast